Pleasant Valley Draw is a stream, in the lower end of Pleasant Valley, that has its source and has its mouth in Juab County, Utah. Its mouth is found at an elevation of  lower in Pleasant Valley, in Utah.

References  

Rivers of Juab County, Utah